The following is a list of visitor attractions in Oldenburg, Lower Saxony, northern Germany.

Tourist attractions
 Augusteum
 Bahnhofsgebäude
 Edith-Russ-Haus
 Elisabeth-Anna-Palais
 Haus "Degode"
 Haus "Graf Anton Günther"
 Horst-Janssen-Museum
 Landesmuseum für Kunst und Kulturgeschichte
 Landesmuseum für Natur und Mensch
 Lappan
 Oldenburger Computer-Museum
 Oldenburgisches Staatstheater
 Peter-Friedrich-Ludwig-Hospital
 Prinzenpalais
 Pulverturm
 Rathaus
 St Lamberti-Kirche
 Schloss Oldenburg
 Schlossgarten Oldenburg
 Schlosshöfe
 Schlossplatz
 Stadtmuseum Oldenburg

Sports venues
 Large EWE Arena
 Marschweg-Stadion
 Small EWE Arena
 Weser-Ems Halle

References

External links
 Oldenburg Tourist website 

Oldenburg
Oldenburg